The British East India Company (EIC) maintained its own navy, the Bombay Marine, and a number of pilot services. The following Bombay Marine or Pilot Service vessels bore the name Phoenix for the constellation or the mythical bird 

Phoenix, a ketch acquired or launched in 1673 and sold to buyers at Bombay in 1679.
Phoenix, a sloop that the EIC's governor of Bencoolen used in 1710.
Phoenix, a schooner that the Bombay Pilot Service used and sold on 30 April 1759 for breaking up.
Phoenix, a schooner of 113 tons (bm) that the Bombay Dockyard launched in 1667, or 1770 for the Bengal Pilot Service, and that was sold to local buyers in June 1778.
Phoenix, agent vessel, of 181 tons (bm), launched 1808 at Kidderpore and sold 18 October 1820.

See also

Citations and references
Citations

References
 
 

Ship names
Ships of the British East India Company